Barclaya is a genus of 3 - 4 species of flowering plants of the family Nymphaeaceae. Barclaya are aquatic plants native to tropical Asia. The genus was named in honour of the American-born English brewer and patron of science Robert Barclay.

Synonym
Though Hydrostemma is a name that is older than the name Barclaya, having been published 6 months earlier, the name Barclaya has been "conserved" as it was deemed being much better known than Hydrostemma.

Taxonomy
Barclaya is sometimes given its own family status as Barclayaceae on the basis of an extended perianth tube (combined sepals and petals) arising from the top of the ovary and by stamens that are joined basally, but morphological and genetic studies support the view that Barclaya should be retained in the family Nymphaeaceae.

Description
Plants grow from egg-shaped tubers that produce short runners and a basal rosette of leaves. All leaves are submerged.

Species

References

External links
Barclaya motleyi pictures

Nymphaeaceae
Aquatic plants
Nymphaeales genera